The rufous-bellied thrush (Turdus rufiventris) is a songbird of the thrush family (Turdidae). It occurs in most of east and southeast Brazil from Maranhão south to Rio Grande do Sul states, Bolivia, Paraguay, Uruguay and central regions of Argentina.

It is one of the most common birds across much of southeastern Brazil, and is known there under the name sabiá-laranjeira. It was famously referred to in the well-known first strophe of the Brazilian nationalist poem Canção do exílio. The rufous-bellied thrush has been the state bird of São Paulo since 1966, and the national bird of Brazil since 2002. It is highly regarded in Brazil, where its song is often heard in the afternoons, but specially during the nights between August and November, where thousands of them sing until the sunrise, and is often seen as "the spirit of the Brazilian commoner".

Description
This species is named after its distinctive reddish-orange underparts. Rufous-bellied thrushes can reach a length of 25 cm and weigh up to 68 g (male) or 78 g (female), though weights of about 59 g for males and 64 g for females are more usual. Contrary to what one might expect from the rather marked weight difference, the females are not larger, only plumper; their tarsus is actually a bit shorter than that of males on average.

Habits
Found in forests and urban wooded areas, it is an omnivorous bird. Its food consists mainly of fruits and arthropods, and it can sometimes be seen attending mixed-species feeding flocks and moving through the bushes with many other birds. It has been observed to squabble with a common marmoset (Callithrix jacchus) in the undergrowth over food flushed by an army ant column, but this was during the dry season when fruits are scarce.

Nesting
It builds an open-cup nest, sometimes right on the forest floor, sometimes more than 20 meters high in a tree, but usually 4–5 meters above ground. In the yungas of NW Argentina, nesting occurred in the wet season from October to March, with most birds breeding in November–December. The three, sometimes two eggs measure about 27-28 by 20 mm, and weigh c.5.7-5.9 grams each. They are incubated for about 12–13 days, and young take about that long again until they fledge. Incubation is solely by the female, which spends considerable time on the nest. The nestlings are attended by both parents however; as the young near fledging, they are fed every 5–7 minutes or so on average. Predation may be a major cause of brood failure; in the southern Andean yungas it was noted to be especially high during the nestling time and far less significant during incubation.

Status
This common and wide-ranging species is not considered threatened by the IUCN.

Gallery

Footnotes

References
 Auer, Sonya K.; Bassar, Ronald D.; Fontaine, Joseph J. & Martin, Thomas E. (2007): Breeding biology of passerines in a subtropical montane forest in Northwestern Argentina. The Condor 109(2): 321-333 [English with Spanish abstract]. DOI:10.1650/0010-5422(2007)109[321:BBOPIA]2.0.CO;2 PDF fulltext
 de Lyra-Neves, Rachel M.; Oliveira, Maria A.B.; Telino-Júnior,Wallace R. & dos Santos, Ednilza M. (2007): Comportamentos interespecíficos entre Callithrix jacchus (Linnaeus) (Primates, Callitrichidae) e algumas aves de Mata Atlântica, Pernambuco, Brasil [Interspecific behaviour between Callithrix jacchus (Linnaeus) (Callitrichidae, Primates) and some birds of the Atlantic forest, Pernanbuco State, Brazil]. Revista Brasileira de Zoologia 24(3): 709–716 [Portuguese with English abstract].  PDF fulltext.
 Machado, C.G. (1999): A composição dos bandos mistos de aves na Mata Atlântica da Serra de Paranapiacaba, no sudeste brasileiro [Mixed flocks of birds in Atlantic Rain Forest in Serra de Paranapiacaba, southeastern Brazil]. Revista Brasileira de Biologia 59(1): 75-85 [Portuguese with English abstract].  PDF fulltext
 Olson, Storrs L. & Alvarenga, Herculano M. F. (2006): An extraordinary feeding assemblage of birds at a termite swarm in the Serra da Mantiqueira, São Paulo, Brazil. Revista Brasileira de Ornitologia 14(3): 297-299 [English with Portuguese abstract]. PDF fulltext
 Sick, Helmut; Haffer, Jürgen; Alvarenga, Herculano F.; Pacheco, José Fernando & Barruel, Paul (1997): Ornitologia Brasileira ["Brazilian Ornithology"]. Editora Nova Fronteira, Rio de Janeiro [In Portuguese].

External links

Rufous-bellied Thrush videos on the Internet Bird Collection
Rufous-bellied Thrush photo gallery VIREO

 sounds of many Brazilian birds

Rufous-bellied Thrush
Birds of Argentina
Birds of Bolivia
Birds of Brazil
Birds of Paraguay
Birds of the Caatinga
Birds of the Cerrado
Birds of the Pantanal
Birds of Uruguay
Rufous-bellied Thrush
Rufous-bellied Thrush
Taxa named by Louis Jean Pierre Vieillot